Three Japanese minesweepers have been named :

See also 

Imperial Japanese Navy ship names
Japanese Navy ship names